Anania ferruginealis is a moth in the family Crambidae. It was described by Warren in 1892. It is found in Brazil (São Paulo, Rio de Janeiro).

References

Moths described in 1892
Pyraustinae
Moths of South America